Qoroq Rural District is a rural district (dehestan) in Baharan District, Gorgan County, Golestan Province, Iran. At the 2006 census, its population was 24,014, in 5,974 families.  The rural district has 18 villages.

References 

Rural Districts of Golestan Province
Gorgan County